Claudia Ciesla is a Polish-born German actress and model who works mainly in the Indian film industry. She was a contestant on the Indian reality television series Bigg Boss.

Early life
Ciesla was born in Wodzisław Śląski, Katowice Voivodeship, Polish People's Republic (now Silesian Voivodeship, Republic of Poland). Her father is a Clinicia psychologist and is of Polish descent and her mother, is an architect and is of German descent.

Career

Modelling and acting career 
Ciesla started modeling at the age of 15 working for shows involved in fashion and dancing.

In March 2006, Ciesla won a subscribers poll on the internet websites of Auto Bild, Bild, Sat.1, T-Online and Kabeleins to give her first place as Germany's Super Girl 2006. In November 2007 she told in an interview, that she plans after her modelling career to become a tax consultant.

In the touristic season of 2007–2008 Ciesla was representing the snowrichest tourist Ski-Village in the World, Damüls, Austria, as the Snow Queen 2008 and was showing up for various events, promotional appearances and photo shoots for magazines, advertising and brochures including a cover shoot for the magazine “MOTOR-Freizeit and TRENDS“ in Austria.

In 2007 and again in 2008 she was appearing on the German Internet soap opera Beach House, playing Daisy Vandenburg. The New Indian Express reported that Ciesla is acting in a Bollywood film Karma along with leads Carlucci Weyant, Alma Saraci as part of an international film crew to be filmed in India. Film Director M.S. Shahjahan mentioned in an interview that there will be more assignments for Ciesla in Bollywood.

In July 2008 Ciesla played "Claudia" in the Italian television sitcom Outsiders in Palermo, shot in Palermo.

She played the role of a German journalist in the film 10:10 (directed by "Arin Paul"), together with Soumitra Chatterjee.

Ciesla was the Brand Ambassador of the "Lovely Professional University". LPU also honoured her as "New promising foreign face in India". She also visited Thapar University for promotion of her Punjabi film during their technical fest Aranya. On 26 November 2009, Ciesla was awarded with the prestigious Karmaveer Puraskaar, which is iCONGO’s National People’s Award for Social Justice and Action, honouring concerned citizens who have led change. Past recipients of the Karmaveer Puraskar include Kajol, Alyque Padamsee, Rahul Bose, Remo Fernandes and M S Swaminathan.

Bigg Boss and Bollywood entry 
Ciesla participated in the reality show Bigg Boss 3. It began airing on 4 October 2009 on Colors with Amitabh Bachchan as the host. This was her first brush with Indian reality TV. She was evicted on day 68, after spending 10 weeks on the show.

In December 2010 Ciesla attended the TV show Zor Ka Jhatka: Total Wipeout shot in Buenos Aires, Argentina. It is the Indian celebrity version of Wipeout with Bollywood actor Shah Rukh Khan as the host. The show ended on 25 February 2011 with Kushal Punjabi as the winner, while Ciesla was the runner-up by 51 seconds, to come in second place.

Ciesla made her first mainstream appearance in 2012, when she did the item song "Balma", sharing screen space with Akshay Kumar in his film Khiladi 786. The song is composed by Himesh Reshammiya and the dance is choreographed by Ganesh Acharya.

In 2016, she appeared in the third part of the successful Bollywood franchise Kyaa Kool Hain Hum film series, titled Kyaa Kool Hain Hum 3. She was last seen dancing on a peppy number alongside Krushna Abhishek in the film Teri Bhabhi Hai Pagle.

Filmography

Television

Personal life
Ciesla was born an Ashkenazic devotee of Judaism, though converted to Hinduism in 2009, after developing interest in Hindu culture and mythology. She is a self-proclaimed adherent of Lord Ganesha and is a Karma believer.

References

External links

 
 
 
 

Living people
Year of birth missing (living people)
People from Wodzisław Śląski
German female models
German film actresses
Polish female models
Polish film actresses
German people of Polish descent
Polish people of German descent
German expatriates in India
Polish expatriates in India
Actresses in Hindi cinema
Actresses in Bengali cinema
Actresses in Kannada cinema
Actresses in Punjabi cinema
Actresses in Malayalam cinema
European actresses in India
Actresses of European descent in Indian films
Converts to Hinduism from Judaism
German Hindus
Polish Hindus
Bigg Boss (Hindi TV series) contestants
21st-century German actresses
21st-century Polish actresses